Expansion may refer to:

Arts, entertainment and media
 L'Expansion, a French monthly business magazine
 Expansion (album), by American jazz pianist Dave Burrell, released in 2004
 Expansions (McCoy Tyner album), 1970
 Expansions (Lonnie Liston Smith album), 1975
 Expansión (Mexico), a Mexican news portal linked to CNN
 Expansion (sculpture) (2004) Bronze sculpture illuminated from within
 Expansión (Spanish newspaper), a Spanish economic daily newspaper published in Spain
 Expansion pack in gaming, extra content for games, often simply "expansion"

Science, technology, and mathematics
 Expansion (geometry), stretching of geometric objects with flat sides
 Expansion (model theory), in mathematical logic, a mutual converse of a reduct
 Expansion card, in computing, a printed circuit board that can be inserted into an expansion slot
 Expansion chamber, on a two-stroke engine, a tuned exhaust system that enhances power output
 Expansion joint, an assembly that absorbs heat-induced expansion and contraction of construction materials
 Joule–Thomson effect or Joule–Thomson expansion, the decrease in temperature of a gas when it expands
 Thermal expansion, the tendency of matter to change in shape, area, and volume in response to a change in temperature
 Expansion of the universe, the increase of the distance between two distant parts of the universe with time

Economics
 Expansion (economics), an increase in the market value of an economy over time

Sport
 Expansion team, a new team in a sports league

Other uses
 MV Expansion, a former name of American cargo liner

See also
 
 
 Expansion chamber (disambiguation)
 Elasticity (disambiguation)
 Expansionism, a policy of enlarging territory or economic influence
 Stretching

es:Expansión